Bertinotti is an Italian surname. Notable people with the surname include:

 Dominique Bertinotti (born 1954), French politician
 Fausto Bertinotti (born 1940), Italian politician
 Teresa Bertinotti, also known as Teresa Bertinotti-Radicati (1776–1854), Italian soprano and voice teacher

See also 

 Bertinetti

Italian-language surnames